Anthony James Ashnault (born June 25, 1995) is an American freestyle wrestler and graduated folkstyle wrestler. In freestyle, he is a two-time Pan American Champion, having won the titles in 2019 and 2020. In folkstyle, he is an NCAA Division I Champion, four-time All-American and three-time Big Ten Champion. He was also a four-time undefeated NJSIAA title holder as a high schooler.

Folkstyle career

High school 
Ashnault was born in Paramus, New Jersey and attended South Plainfield High School. He remained undefeated all four years of varsity with a record of 170 wins and no losses and went on to win four NJSIAA state titles at four different weight classes (103, 112, 126 & 138).

University 
After graduating, Ashnault committed to wrestle as a Scarlet Knight at Rutgers University, where he competed at 141-pounds all years but his senior year, competing at 149 instead. As a redshirt athlete, he compiled a record of 15-3 while wrestling unattached in open tournaments.

As a freshman, he finished the season with 29 wins and 8 losses. Post-season, he placed fifth at the Big Ten Championships, becoming the highest-placing Scarlet Knight at his first tournament. At the 15' NCAA's, he placed eight, earning All-American honors.

As a sophomore, he compiled a 33–5 record through season. Brought Rutgers their first individual Big Ten title ever. He placed fourth at the 16' NCAA's to become the first two-time All-American in the history of the program.

In his junior season, he posted a record of 30–6, became a three-time All-American with a sixth-place finish at the 17' NCAA Championships and won his second straight Big Ten championship. Ashnault was initially unable to compete as a senior and missed the whole season due to an injury.

The NCAA granted Ashnault a sixth year of eligibility for the 2018–19 season. He compiled an undefeated 32–0 record through the season, in which he competed at 149-pounds unlike his previous seasons. He won his third-consecutive Big Ten Championship and also won the prestigious 19' NCAA Championship, becoming the second Scarlet Knight to do so after his teammate Nick Suriano, who won the individual title in his weight class earlier in the tournament.

Ashnault graduated that year with a record of 139–22.

Freestyle career 
Previous to competing as a senior, Ashnault had already competed multiple times in freestyle wrestling as a junior in competitions such as the FILA (UWW) Nationals and World Trials.

2014 
Ashnault won the University Nationals at 65 kilograms, and was scheduled to compete at a best-of-three qualifier for the World University Championship against Jordan Oliver, but Oliver missed weight and was pulled out of the event. This earned Ashnault the spot. He placed tenth at the world-level tournament.

2019 
Ashnault competed at the Pan American Championships on April 18. He defeated every opponent he faced in the bracket at 70 kilograms, winning the championship.

Ashnault went on to compete at an exhibition bout at the annual Beat The Streets against 2017 World Championship runner-up James Green. He lost the contest by points (4-8).

Ashnault competed at the World Team Trials Challenge Tournament in an attempt to qualify for the World Championships. He won his first two bouts to reach the finals, in which he faced James Green in a rematch. When Green was rolling Ashnault's legs to get back exposure points, Ashnault suffered a knee injury which led him to a 0-10 technical fall loss and was forced to medical forfeit the second bout, awarding Green the next victory he needed to win the best-of-three.

2020 
After recovering from the injury, the defending champion competed at the Pan American Championships in his first competition of the year. Last year's results were repeated as Ashnault defeated every opponent he faced to become a two-time Pan American Champion. This outcome qualified him for the US Olympic Trials.

Ashnault was scheduled to compete at the 2020 US Olympic Trials on April, at State College, Pennsylvania, however, the event was postponed until 2021 due to the coronavirus outbreak, along with the Olympics. Ashnault announced that he would attempt to make the team at 65 kilograms, and will do so in 2021. After the Olympic Trials were postponed for next year, Ashnault had been slated to compete against Luke Pletcher on July 25 at FloWrestling: Dake vs. Chamizo. However, he was forced to pull out of the event on July 6 due to injury.

Ashnault was scheduled to wrestle Austin O'Connor at the THWC Open I, on December 4, but was unable to compete due to conflicts with FloWrestling. Instead, he came back at the Flo Eight-Man Challenge: 150 pounds, on December 18. After a close criteria win over '20 US National finalist Evan Henderson, Ashnault was soundly defeated by three-time World Championship medalist Bajrang Punia and '20 Cerro Pelado International champion Alec Pantaleo.

2021 
To start off the year, Ashnault wrestled the 2020 Pan American champion (65 kg) Yianni Diakomihalis on January 8, at the SCRTC I. After getting scored on with two two-point takedowns and a step-out, Diakomihalis scored a five-point slam, driving Ashnault to a technical fall. He then competed at the rescheduled US Olympic Trials in April 2, and after defeating Nahshon Garrett in the first round, he was defeated by top–seeded Zain Retherford and was eliminated by Evan Henderson.

Ashnault has registered to come back at the 2021 US World Team Trials on September 10–12, intending to represent the country at the World Championships.

Major results

Freestyle record 

! colspan="7"| Senior Freestyle Matches
|-
!  Res.
!  Record
!  Opponent
!  Score
!  Date
!  Event
!  Location
|-
! style=background:white colspan=7 |
|-
|
|
|
|style="font-size:88%"|
|style="font-size:88%" rowspan=1|February 27, 2022
|style="font-size:88%" rowspan=1|2022 Yasar Dogu International
|style="text-align:left;font-size:88%;" rowspan=1|
 Istanbul, Turkey
|-
! style=background:white colspan=7 |
|-
|Loss
|26–11
|align=left| Evan Henderson
|style="font-size:88%"|TF 2–12
|style="font-size:88%" rowspan=3|April 2–3, 2021
|style="font-size:88%" rowspan=3|2020 US Olympic Team Trials
|style="text-align:left;font-size:88%;" rowspan=3| Forth Worth, Texas
|-
|Loss
|26–10
|align=left| Zain Retherford
|style="font-size:88%"|1–5
|-
|Win
|26–9
|align=left| Nahshon Garrett
|style="font-size:88%"|8–2
|-
|Loss
|25-9
|align=left| Yianni Diakomihalis
|style="font-size:88%"|TF 0-10
|style="font-size:88%"|January 8, 2021
|style="font-size:88%"|SCRTC I
|style="text-align:left;font-size:88%;" |
 Austin, Texas
|-
! style=background:white colspan=7 |
|-
|Loss
|25-8
|align=left| Alec Pantaleo
|style="font-size:88%"|1-8
|style="font-size:88%" rowspan=3|December 18, 2020
|style="font-size:88%" rowspan=3|Flo 8-Man Challenge: 150 lbs
|style="text-align:left;font-size:88%;" rowspan=3|
 Austin, Texas
|-
|Loss
|25-7
|align=left| Bajrang Punia
|style="font-size:88%"|0-9
|-
|Win
|25-6
|align=left| Evan Henderson
|style="font-size:88%"|6-6
|-
! style=background:white colspan=7 | 
|-
|Win
|24-6
|align=left| Hugo Leonardo De Lima Viana De Souza
|style="font-size:88%"|Fall
|style="font-size:88%" rowspan=4|March 8, 2020
|style="font-size:88%" rowspan=4|2020 Pan American Wrestling Championships
|style="text-align:left;font-size:88%;" rowspan=4|
 Ottawa, Canada
|-
|Win
|23-6
|align=left| Cruiz Manning
|style="font-size:88%"|TF 12-2
|-
|Win
|22-6
|align=left| Brandon Díaz
|style="font-size:88%"|Fall
|-
|Win
|21-6
|align=left| Ranico Howard
|style="font-size:88%"|Fall
|-
! style=background:white colspan=7 | 
|-
|Loss
|20-6
|align=left| James Green
|style="font-size:88%"|TF 0-10
|style="font-size:88%" rowspan=3|May 18–19, 2019
|style="font-size:88%" rowspan=3|2019 US World Team Trials Challenge Tournament
|style="text-align:left;font-size:88%;" rowspan=3|
 Raleigh, North Carolina
|-
|Win
|20-5
|align=left| Jason Chamberlain
|style="font-size:88%"|2-1
|-
|Win
|19-5
|align=left| Hayden Hidlay
|style="font-size:88%"|5-4
|-
|Loss
|18-5
|align=left| James Green
|style="font-size:88%"|4-8
|style="font-size:88%"|May 6, 2019
|style="font-size:88%"|2019 Beat The Streets: Grapple at the Garden
|style="text-align:left;font-size:88%;" |
 New York City, New York
|-
! style=background:white colspan=7 | 
|-
|Win
|18-4
|align=left| Cristian Andres Karlikowski
|style="font-size:88%"|TF 10-0
|style="font-size:88%" rowspan=4|April 19–21, 2019
|style="font-size:88%" rowspan=4|2019 Pan American Wrestling Championships
|style="text-align:left;font-size:88%;" rowspan=4|
 Buenos Aires, Argentina
|-
|Win
|17-4
|align=left| Hugo Leonardo De Lima Viana De Souza
|style="font-size:88%"|TF 10-0
|-
|Win
|16-4
|align=left| Mitchel Edson Taipe Duanama
|style="font-size:88%"|Fall
|-
|Win
|15-4
|align=left| Nicholas Rowe
|style="font-size:88%"|TF 12-2
|-
! style=background:white colspan=7 | 
|-
|Loss
|14-4
|align=left| Logan Stieber
|style="font-size:88%"|Fall
|style="font-size:88%" rowspan=4|April 24–28, 2018
|style="font-size:88%" rowspan=4|2018 US Open National Championships
|style="text-align:left;font-size:88%;" rowspan=4|
 Las Vegas, Nevada
|-
|Win
|14-3
|align=left| Freddy Eckles
|style="font-size:88%"|TF 10-0
|-
|Win
|13-3
|align=left| Dylan Thurston
|style="font-size:88%"|TF 13-2
|-
|Loss
|12-3
|align=left| Nick Dardanes
|style="font-size:88%"|7-8
|-
! style=background:white colspan=7 | 
|-
|Win
|12-2
|align=left| Kevin Budock
|style="font-size:88%"|TF 12-1
|style="font-size:88%" rowspan=3|June 2–4, 2017
|style="font-size:88%" rowspan=3|2017 ASICS University Nat - FS
|style="text-align:left;font-size:88%;" rowspan=3|
 Akron, Ohio
|-
|Win
|11-2
|align=left| Collin Purinton
|style="font-size:88%"|11-9
|-
|Win
|10-2
|align=left| Anthony Rubino
|style="font-size:88%"|TF 10-0
|-
! style=background:white colspan=7 | 
|-
|Loss
|9-2
|align=left| Mihai Sava
|style="font-size:88%"|1-4
|style="font-size:88%"|July 8–12, 2014
|style="font-size:88%"|2014 World University Championships
|style="text-align:left;font-size:88%;" |
 Pécs, Hungary
|-
! style=background:white colspan=7 | 
|-
|Win
|9-1
|align=left| Michael Mangrum
|style="font-size:88%"|6-0
|style="font-size:88%" rowspan=7|May 22–25, 2014
|style="font-size:88%" rowspan=7|2014 ASICS University Nat - FS
|style="text-align:left;font-size:88%;" rowspan=7|
 Akron, Ohio
|-
|Win
|8-1
|align=left| Michael Mangrum
|style="font-size:88%"|5-4
|-
|Win
|7-1
|align=left| Jason Tsirtsis
|style="font-size:88%"|8-7
|-
|Win
|6-1
|align=left| Steven Keith
|style="font-size:88%"|6-4
|-
|Win
|5-1
|align=left| Christopher Araoz
|style="font-size:88%"|TF 10-0
|-
|Win
|4-1
|align=left| Andrew Cosper
|style="font-size:88%"|TF 11-0
|-
|Win
|3-1
|align=left| Ben Polkowske
|style="font-size:88%"|18-9
|-
! style=background:white colspan=7 | 
|-
|Loss
|2-1
|align=left| Josh Demas
|style="font-size:88%"|6-7
|style="font-size:88%" rowspan=3|May 2–4, 2014
|style="font-size:88%" rowspan=3|2014 Phil Portuese NE Regional - FS
|style="text-align:left;font-size:88%;" rowspan=3|
 East Stroudsburg, Pennsylvania
|-
|Win
|2-0
|align=left| Matt Cimato
|style="font-size:88%"|TF 12-1
|-
|Win
|1-0
|align=left| Shane Roggie
|style="font-size:88%"|TF 10-0
|-

NCAA record 

! colspan="8"| NCAA Championships Matches
|-
!  Res.
!  Record
!  Opponent
!  Score
!  Date
!  Event
|-
! style=background:white colspan=6 |2019 NCAA Championships  at 149 lbs
|-
|Win
|15-8
|align=left|Micah Jordan
|style="font-size:88%"|9-4
|style="font-size:88%" rowspan=5|March 20–22, 2019
|style="font-size:88%" rowspan=5|2019 NCAA Division I Wrestling Championships
|-
|Win
|14-8
|align=left|Matthew Kolodzik
|style="font-size:88%"|2-0
|-
|Win
|13-8
|align=left|Jarrett Degen
|style="font-size:88%"|10-3
|-
|Win
|12-8
|align=left|Davion Jeffries
|style="font-size:88%"|7-1
|-
|Win
|11-8
|align=left|Malik Amine
|style="font-size:88%"|MD 10-2
|-
! style=background:white colspan=6 |2017 NCAA Championships 6th at 141 lbs
|-
|Loss
|10-8
|align=left|Jaydin Eierman
|style="font-size:88%"|2-4
|style="font-size:88%" rowspan=6|March 15–17, 2017
|style="font-size:88%" rowspan=6|2017 NCAA Division I Wrestling Championships
|-
|Loss
|10-7
|align=left|Kevin Jack
|style="font-size:88%"|1-3
|-
|Loss
|10-6
|align=left|Dean Heil 
|style="font-size:88%"|2-4
|-
|Win
|10-5
|align=left|Matthew Kolodzik
|style="font-size:88%"|6-2
|-
|Win
|9-5
|align=left|Luke Pletcher
|style="font-size:88%"|8-7
|-
|Win
|8-5
|align=left|Mason Smith
|style="font-size:88%"|8-3
|-
! style=background:white colspan=6 |2016 NCAA Championships 4th at 141 lbs
|-
|Loss
|7-5
|align=left|Joey McKenna
|style="font-size:88%"|6-7
|style="font-size:88%" rowspan=6|March 16–18, 2016
|style="font-size:88%" rowspan=6|2016 NCAA Division I Wrestling Championships
|-
|Win
|7-4
|align=left|Solomon Chishko 
|style="font-size:88%"|MD 11-3
|-
|Loss
|6-4
|align=left|Dean Heil 
|style="font-size:88%"|3-8
|-
|Win
|6-3
|align=left|Chris Mecate
|style="font-size:88%"|5-4
|-
|Win
|5-3
|align=left|Seth Gross
|style="font-size:88%"|MD 15-2
|-
|Win
|4-3
|align=left|Jamel Hudson
|style="font-size:88%"|TF 16-0
|-
! style=background:white colspan=6 |2015 NCAA Championships 8th at 141 lbs
|-
|Loss
|3-2
|align=left|Dean Heil
|style="font-size:88%"|4-9
|style="font-size:88%" rowspan=5|March 18–20, 2015
|style="font-size:88%" rowspan=5|2015 NCAA Division I Wrestling Championships
|-
|Win
|3-1
|align=left|Randy Cruz 
|style="font-size:88%"|3-2
|-
|Loss
|2-1
|align=left|Mitchell Port
|style="font-size:88%"|4-9
|-
|Win
|2–0
|align=left|Zachary Horan
|style="font-size:88%"|6-3
|-
|Win
|1-0
|align=left|Mike Longo
|style="font-size:88%"|9-2

Stats 

!  Season
!  Year
!  School
!  Rank
!  Weigh Class
!  Record
!  Win
!  Bonus
|-
|2019
|Senior
|rowspan=4|Rutgers University
|#1 (1st)
|149
|32-0
|100.00%
|59.38%
|-
|2017
|Junior
|#3 (6th)
|rowspan=3|141
|30-6
|83.33%
|52.78%
|-
|2016
|Sophomore
|#2 (4th)
|33-5
|86.84%
|47.37%
|-
|2015
|Freshman
|#18 (8th)
|29-8
|78.38%
|32.43%
|-
|colspan=5 bgcolor="LIGHTGREY"|Career
|bgcolor="LIGHTGREY"|124-19
|bgcolor="LIGHTGREY"|86.84%
|bgcolor="LIGHTGREY"|47.99%

References

External links 
 

Living people
1995 births
American male sport wrestlers
People from South Plainfield, New Jersey
Sportspeople from Middlesex County, New Jersey
Pan American Wrestling Championships medalists
Rutgers Scarlet Knights wrestlers
20th-century American people
21st-century American people